Nicolás Álvarez Varona (born 18 May 2001) is a Spanish tennis player.

Álvarez Varona has a career high ATP singles ranking of World No. 270 achieved on 5 July 2022. He also has a career high ATP doubles ranking of World No. 1297 achieved on 4 April 2022.

Career

2022: ATP tour debut
Álvarez Varona made his ATP main draw debut at the 2022 Barcelona Open Banc Sabadell after qualifying for the singles main draw, defeating Philipp Kohlschreiber and Max Alcalá Gurri before losing to Brandon Nakashima.

References

External links

2001 births
Living people
Spanish male tennis players
Sportspeople from Burgos